Moon carrot is the common name for two members of the genus Seseli:

 S. libanotis
 S. gummiferum